Branka Primorac (Zagreb, 1964) is Croatian novelist and journalist.

She attended Faculty of Political Sciences on Zagreb University. She writes for newspapers Večernji list.

He wrote several novels for children. She writes about adolescence, Croatian War for Independence, culture, animals and love.

Branka Primorac won three Croatian literary prizes for her works.

References 

Living people
1964 births
Journalists from Zagreb
Writers from Zagreb
Croatian columnists
Croatian women journalists
Croatian women columnists